Euplica festiva is a species of sea snail, a marine gastropod mollusk in the family Columbellidae, the dove snails.

Description
The shell size varies between 7 mm and 11 mm

Distribution
This species occurs in the Red Sea, the Gulf of Aden, the Indian Ocean along Chagos, Madagascar,  the Seychelles and Réunion and along West India, the Bonin Islands and south of Japan.
 Kilburn R.N. & Marais J.P. (2010) Columbellidae. Pp. 60-104, in: Marais A.P. & Seccombe A.D. (eds), Identification guide to the seashells of South Africa. Volume 1. Groenkloof: Centre for Molluscan Studies. 376 pp.

References

 Cossignani T. (2005) Nuove Euplica del Madagascar (Gastropoda: Prosobranchia, Neogastropoda, Muricoidea). Malacologia Mostra Mondiala 46: 4-5.
 Martens, E. von. (1904). Die beschalten Gastropoden der deutschen Tiefsee-Expedition 1898–1899. A. Systematisch-geographischer Teil. Wissenschaftliche Ergebnisse der deutschen Tiefsee-Expedition auf dem Dampfer "Valdivia". 7(A): 1–146, pls i–v.

External links
 
 Deshayes G.P. (1833). [Coquilles de la Mer Rouge in L. de Laborde, Voyage de l'Arabie Pétrée par Léon de Laborde et Linant. Giard, Paris. 87 pp, 69 pl., 2 maps.]
 Duclos P.L. (1840). Histoire naturelle générale et particulière de tous les genres de coquilles univalves marines a l'état vivant et fossile, publiée par monographie. Genre Colombelle. Didot, Paris. 13 pl.
 Gaskoin, J. S. (1852 ["1851"). Descriptions of twenty species of Columbellae, and one species of Cypraea. Proceedings of the Zoological Society of London. 19: 2-14]

Columbellidae
Gastropods described in 1834